Sayyed Abdul Sakur Baba of Tarbha is one of the extremely popular personalities of Sufi Order. Tarbha Waale Baba also known as Sayyed Abdul Sakur Baba also at times referred as Aulade Ghause Azam Abdul Shukur Khan Baba. His most common name is Tarba Wale baba from Tarbha Sharif

Early life and background 
Sayyed Abdul Sakur Baba was born on 20 June 1831 in Kandhar, Afghanistan. He was allegedly 154 years at the time of his death in 1984 on March 16 at 10:05 PM. His father's name was Sayyed Mohammed Siddiq. Tarbha waale Baba worked as a muzavar for Sayyedana Gouse E Azam for 30 years in Baghdad.

Then later he migrated to Tarbha in Orissa in 1931 CE, at that time his age was about 100 years. He permanently migrated to Tarbha on the direct orders of Sayyedana Gouse e Azam. In the Sufi order he is so well known that during his reign even other Awliya (Saints) used to visit him. He lived in a thatched house (hut) and he prayed Namaj five times. Later he built a grand mosque at Tarbha.

Shrine 
His shrine or Dargah is located in Tarbha under Sonepur District, Orissa. Tarbha Sharif is located 23 km from Balangir, Orissa. And direct Trains are available to Balangir Station.

Every year Urs ceremony is organized by Urs Committee of Tarbha, where many people from different religions (Hindus, Muslims, Christians, Sikhs) come and receive the blessings of Tarba Waale Baba. Devotees from Hong Kong, Sri Lanka, Dubai, Nepal, Bangladesh and Afghanistan also come to receive the blessing of Tarbha Baba. The shrine of Sayyed Abdul Sakur Baba is a symbol of communal harmony among the different communities, particularly the people of western Orissa.

References 

 

Dargahs in India